Eduardo Soto (born 3 March 1990) is a Guatemalan footballer who plays as a right-back for Liga Nacional club Municipal.

He made his debut for the full Guatemalan team against Cuba on the 19 August 2018.

References

External links
 
 

1990 births
Living people
Guatemalan footballers
Guatemala international footballers
Association football defenders
Deportivo Iztapa players
Deportivo Marquense players
Cobán Imperial players
Liga Nacional de Fútbol de Guatemala players